Omiza is a genus of moths in the family Geometridae erected by Francis Walker in 1860.

Species
Omiza herois (Prout, 1932)
Omiza lycoraria (Guenée, 1857)
Omiza miliaria Swinhoe, 1889
Omiza pachiaria Walker, 1860

References

Hypochrosini